Bridge, or more formally contract bridge, is a trick-taking card game of skill played by four players.

Summary
WBF Championships:

The World Bridge Team Championships are held in the odd-numbered years:

World Team Championships (Open Series: Bermuda Bowl)
World Team Championships (Women series: Venice Cup)
World Team Championships (Senior series: d'Orsi Senior Trophy)
World Transnational Open Team (WTOT)

The World Bridge Games are held every fourth year, in the same year as the Summer Olympics, previously known as World Team Olympiad.

National Open Teams
National Women Teams
National Senior Teams
World Transnational Mixed Team

The World Bridge Series Championships are held every fourth year, in the year of World Cup. It includes the following main events:

World Open Knockout Teams (Rosenblum Cup)
World Women Knockout Teams (McConnell Cup)
World Senior Knockout Teams (Rand Cup)
World Mixed Swiss Teams
World Mixed Pairs
World Open Pairs
World Women Pairs
World Senior Pairs (Hiron Trophy)

World Championships

World Bridge Federation
World Bridge Championships conducted by the World Bridge Federation
"World Teams" or World Bridge Team Championships (biennial, next 2017)
Bermuda Bowl —from 1950
Venice Cup —from 1974
Senior Bowl (bridge) —from 2001
World Transnational Open Teams Championship
"World Series" or World Bridge Series Championships (quadrennial, next 2018)
 World Open Knockout Teams (Rosenblum Cup) —from 1978
 World Women Knockout Teams (McConnell Cup) —from 1994
 World Senior Teams Championship (Rand Cup) —from 1994
 World Mixed Swiss Teams
 World Open Pairs Championship —from 1962
 World Women Pairs Championship —from 1962
 World Senior Pairs Championship (Hiron Trophy) —from 1990
 World Mixed Pairs Championship —from 1966
 World IMP Pairs Championship —from 2006
"World Bridge Games" or Bridge at the World Mind Sports Games (quadrennial, next 2020)

 World Masters Individual —from 1992 Open and Women (Juniors 2000 only)

 World Team Olympiad —1960–2004 national teams events; Open and Women incorporated in the Games 2008 and "Senior International Cup" continued as a non-medal event
 World Mixed Teams Championship —1962/72/74, 1996–2004, continued as a non-medal event beside the Games 2008 
Youth events covered below
World Par Championship —sanctioned by WBF 1961 and 1963, by Culbertson 1932–1941

Youth
WBF
 World Junior Pairs Championship —covers all WBF competition for Youth Pairs and Individuals
 Junior Pairs (under 26) is the oldest event, from 1995, biennial in odd years
 World Junior Teams Championship —covers all WBF competition for Youth Teams
 Junior Teams (under 26) is the oldest event, from 1987; biennial now in even years with Olympic years incorporated in the WMSG from 2008

 As of 2011-08 University teams are also covered in the Junior Teams article.
 World University Bridge Championships —2000 and biennial from 2004 (at the table); from 2009, annual (online)

9TH WORLD UNIVERSITY BRIDGE CHAMPIONSHIP  2018-10-25 ~ 10-28  XUZHOU,CHINA

Others
 Commonwealth Nations Bridge Championships —

Great Britain
Events conducted by Bridge Great Britain:
 The Gold Cup, the annual open British knock-out Teams of Four Championship
 The Home International Series, comprising:
 The Camrose Trophy, an annual competition between teams representing England, the Republic of Ireland, Northern Ireland, Scotland and Wales
 The Lady Milne Trophy for Women's Teams
 The Senior Camrose for the Teltscher Trophy
 The Junior Camrose for players aged under 26 years 
 The Peggy Bayer Trophy for players aged under 21 years

North America
 North American Bridge Championships conducted by the American Contract Bridge League —three annual 11-day meets that include many NABC-level championship events among others
 United States Bridge Championships conducted by the United States Bridge Federation to select national teams, including Open, Women's, Mixed, Senior, and Junior series
 ACBL Hall of Fame
 Mott-Smith: The Geoffrey Mott-Smith Trophy is awarded to the player winning the most masterpoints at the Spring NABC.
 Fishbein: The Sally Fishbein trophy is awarded to the player winning the most masterpoints at the Summer NABC in NABC+ events.
 Championship Player of the Year: The Championship Player of the Year is awarded to the player winning the most masterpoints won at NABCs while playing in unlimited national-rated events, including the North American Open Pairs and excluding the Grand National Team competitions.
 Barry Crane Top 500: The annual Barry Crane Top 500 masterpoint race is won by the player who earns the most colored masterpoints during the year. Masterpoints won on-line do not count.
 Ace of Clubs: The annual Ace of Clubs masterpoint races are won by the player from each masterpoint category through Diamond Life Master who earns the most masterpoints in club games during the year.
 Mini-McKenney: The annual Mini-McKenney masterpoint races are won by the member from each masterpoint category who earns the most total masterpoints during the year.

Europe
 European championships conducted by the European Bridge League
European Team Championships — national teams, open flight from 1932
European Open Bridge Championships
European Youth Teams Championships — national teams, open flight from 1968
European Youth Pairs Championships

Asia Pacific (Zone 6)
Far East Bridge Federation & Pacific Asia Bridge Federation.

Asia Pacific Bridge Federation Championships (APBF) (Previously Far East Federation Championships).

Members
Zonal and National Organizations:

Country / Organization / Membership / Status

1 	 Chinese Contract Bridge Association 	CBA 81,500 OK

2 	 Hong Kong Contract Bridge Association Ltd HKCBA 432 OK

3 	 Macau Contract Bridge Association MCBA 81 OK

4 	 Chinese Taipei Contract Bridge Association 	CTCBA 2,477 OK

5 		Indonesian Contract Bridge Association 	IBA 1,365 OK

6 	 Japan Contract Bridge League Inc 	JCBL 7,043 OK

7 	 Korea Contract Bridge League 	KCBL 235 OK

8 	 Malaysian Contract Bridge Association 	MCBA 71 OK

9 	 Philippine Tournament Bridge Association 	PTBA 131 OK

10 	 Singapore Contract Bridge Association 	SCBA 185 OK

11 	 Contract Bridge League of Thailand 	CBLT 3,274 OK

12 	 VietNam Bridge & Poker Sports Association 	VBPSA N/A OK

Total 96,794 	

Membership always refers to the previous year.

Asia Pacific Bridge Federation Championships
Year /Host City /Open Team (Rebullid Cup) /Ladies Team(President's Cup) /Senior Team(PABF Senior Cup)

1st 	1957 	Manila 	Philippines 	  	 
2nd 	1958 	Tokyo 	Philippines 	  	 
3rd 	1959 	Taipei 	Hong Kong 	  	 
4th 	1960 	Hong Kong 	Hong Kong 	  	 
5th 	1961 	Bangkok 	Thailand 	  	 
6th 	1962 	Manila 	Indonesia 	  	 
7th 	1963 	Taipei 	Thailand 	Chinese Taipei 	 
8th 	1964 	Tokyo 	Indonesia 	Thailand 	 
9th 	1965 	Hong Kong 	Thailand 	Malaysia 	 
10th 	1966 	Bangkok 	Thailand 	Thailand 	 
11th 	1967 	Manila 	Chinese Taipei 	Philippines 	 
12th 	1968 	Kuala Lumpur 	Australia 	Philippines 	 
13th 	1969 	Taipei 	Chinese Taipei 	Singapore 	 
14th 	1970 	Jakarta 	Australia 	Indonesia 	 
15th 	1971 	Melbourne 	Chinese Taipei 	Singapore 	 
16th 	1972 	Singapore 	Indonesia 	Singapore 	 
17th 	1973 	Hong Kong 	Indonesia 	Australia 	 
18th 	1974 	Manila 	Indonesia 	Australia 	 
19th 	1975 	Bangkok 	Hong Kong 	Australia 	 
20th 	1976 	Auckland 	Chinese Taipei 	New Zealand 	 
21st 	1977 	Manila 	India 	Australia 	 
22nd 	1978 	New Delhi 	Chinese Taipei 	India 	 
23rd 	1979 	Tokyo 	Indonesia 	Philippines 	 
  	1980 	Not held due to the Olympiad
24th 	1981 	Taipei 	Chinese Taipei 	New Zealand 	 
25th 	1982 	Bangkok 	Indonesia 	Philippines 	 
26th 	1983 	Hong Kong 	Indonesia 	New Zealand 	 
27th 	1984 	Macau 	Indonesia 	Australia 	 
28th 	1985 	Sydney 	Japan 	Australia 	 
29th 	1986 	Penang 	Chinese Taipei 	China 	 
30th 	1987 	Shanghai 	Hong Kong 	Japan 	 
  	1988 	Singapore 	1st FEBF Congress
31st 	1989 	Jakarta 	Chinese Taipei 	Chinese Taipei 	 
32nd 	1990 	Singapore 	New Zealand 	Australia 	 
33rd 	1991 	Guangzhou 	China 	China 	 
  	1992 	Hong Kong 	2nd FEBF Congress
34th 	1993 	Singapore 	Indonesia 	China 	 
35th 	1994 	Wellington 	Chinese Taipei 	China 	 
36th 	1995 	Perth 	New Zealand 	Australia 	 
  	1996 	Macau 	3rd PABF Congress
37th 	1997 	Hong Kong 	Chinese Taipei 	China 	 
38th 	1998 	Kobe 	China 	China 	 
39th 	1999 	Hangzhou 	Indonesia 	China 	 
  	2000 	Jakarta 	4th PABF Congress
40th 	2001 	Singapore 	Chinese Taipei 	China 	 
41st 	2002 	Bangkok 	Japan 	China 	Indonesia
42nd 	2003 	Manila 	Indonesia 	China 	Japan
  	2004 	Taipei 	5th PABF Congress
43rd 	2005 	Seoul 	China 	China 	Japan
44th 	2006 	Shanghai 	China 	New Zealand 	Australia
45th 	2007 	Bandung 	China 	China 	Indonesia
  	2008 	Surfers' Paradise 	6th PABF Congress
46th 	2009 	Macau 	China 	China 	Indonesia
47th 	2010 	Hamilton 	Chinese Taipei 	Japan 	Australia
  	Ningbo 	1st Asia Cup
48th 	2011 	Kuala Lumpur 	China 	China 	Indonesia
  	2012 	Fukuoka 	7th APBF Congress
49th 	2013 	Hong Kong 	Japan 	Japan 	Australia
  	2014 	Jinhua 	2nd Asia Cup
50th 	2015 	Bangkok 	Japan 	China 	Indonesia
 	2016 	Beijing 	8th APBF Congress
  The 51st APBF Championships  2017-05-28 ~ 06-07  Riviera Hotel, Seoul, Korea 
  52nd Asia Pacific Bridge Federation Championships  2019-06-11 ~ 06-20  York Hotel, Singapore

Asia Pacific Bridge Federation Youth Championships (U26 / U21)
Asia Pacific Bridge Federation Youth Championships

19th Asia Pacific Bridge Federation Youth Championships Wuhan, China 2013, 19–25 August 2013

20th Asia Pacific Bridge Federation Youth Championships Bangkok, Thailand, 1–7 April 2015

22nd Asia Pacific Bridge Federation Open Youth Championships Bogor, Indonesia April 13–20, 2018  2018 APBF Open Youth Championships

23rd APBF Youth Championships  2019-04-05 ~ 04-11  Bangkok, Thailand

Southeast Asia Bridge Federation Championships
Southeast Asia Bridge Federation Championships

2nd SEABF Championships  2017-12-06 ~ 12-12  The Margo Hotel, Depok, West Java South East Asia Bridge Federation

3rd Southeast Asia Bridge Federation Championships  2018-11-27 ~ 12-01 Makati City, Philippines

4th Southeast Asia Bridge Federation Championships  2019-11-25 ~ 11-29  Indoor Training Hall, Olympic Council of Malaysia

Asia Cup
Asia Cup Bridge Championships

2014 Jinhua 2nd Asia Cup  2nd Asia Cup Bridge Championships  2014-06-12 ~ 06-22 ZheJiang WuYi JinHua , China

3rd Asia Cup Bridge Championships  2018-06-04 ~ 06-10  Goa, India ASIA PACIFIC BRIDGE FEDERATION

Asia & Middle East (Zone 4)
List of Asia and Middle East Bridge Championships:

History
Founded in 1979 as Bridge Federation of Asia & the Middle East.

From 5 original NBOs grew to 10 member countries.

In 1996, the Bridge Federation of Africa, Asia & the Middle East (BFAAME) was divided into (the obvious) 3 subzones.

In 2000, the African NBO’s formed Zone 8 of the WBF and Zone 4 was once again renamed to its original Bridge Federation of Asia & the Middle East (BFAME).

Members
Zonal and National Organizations

Country/Organization/Membership/Status

1 	 Bangladesh Bridge Federation BngBF 180 OK

2 	 Bridge Federation of India BFI 4,650 OK

3 	Jordan Bridge Federation JBA 250 OK

4 	 Kuwait Mind Sports Association 	KMSA 66 OK

5 	 Pakistan Bridge Federation 	PBF 500 OK

6 	 Palestine Bridge Federation PaBF 150 OK

7 	 Saudi Arabian Bridge Federation SdABF 67 OK

8 	 Bridge Federation of Sri Lanka 	BFSL 120 OK

9 	 Syrian Bridge Association 	SBA N/A OK

10 	 United Arab Emirates Bridge Federation 	UAEBF 150 OK

Total 6,133 	

Membership always refers to the previous year.

Championships
1st ASIA & MIDDLE EAST CHAMPIONSHIPS - 1981 Venue: Bangalore, India Dates: 11–19 April 1981 (25th Bermuda Bowl (7) & 4th Venice Cup (5), Port Chester, New York, USA. (19-30 Oct.))

2nd ASIA AND MIDDLE EAST CHAMPIONSHIPS - 1983 Venue: Le Meidien Paradise Hotel, Le Morne Peninsula, Port Louise, Mauritius Dates : 13 – 22 May’83.

3rd ASIA & MIDDLE EAST CHAMPIONSHIPS - 1985 Venue: Taj Mahal Hotel, Karachi, Pakistan Dates: 18 – 30 April 1985

CANCELLATION in 1985

4TH ASIA & CHAMPIONSHIPS - 1987 Venue: Taj Samudra Hotel, Colombo, Sri Lanka Dates: 29 March to 9 April 1987

5TH ASIA & MIDDLE EAST CHAMPIONSHIPS-1989 Venue: Ramses Nile Hilton, Cairo, Egypt Dates: 1 to 13 June 1989

6TH ASIA AND MIDDLE EAST CHAMPIONSHIPS - 1991 Venue: Sheraton Hotel, New Delhi, India Dates: 7–17 July 1991

7TH ASIA & MIDDLE EAST CHAMPIONSHIPS-1993 Venue: Le Mauricia Hotel, Grand Bay, Port Louis, Mauritius. Dates: May 1993

8TH AFRICA ASIA & MIDDLE EAST CHAMPIONSHIPS-1995 Venue: Forte Grand Hotel, Amman, Jordan Dates: 22 April 1995 – 3 May 1995.

9TH AFRICA ASIA & MIDDLE EAST CHAMPIONSHIPS-1997 Venue: Arthur Seat Hotel, Cape Town, South Africa. Dates: 16 May 1997- 28 May 1997.

10TH AFRICA ASIA & MIDDLE EAST CHAMPIONSHIPS-1999 Venue: Taj Samudra Hotel, Colombo, Sri Lanka. Dates: 2 Oct 1999 – 14 Oct 1999

11TH ASIA & MIDDLE EAST CHAMPIONSHIPS-2001 Venue: Gulf Hotel, Manama, Bahrain Dates: 23 May 2001 – 2 June 2001.

12TH ASIA & MIDDLE EAST CHAMPIONSHIPS-2003 Venue: Regency Palace Hotel, Amman, Jordan Dates: 1 August 2003 – 9 August 2003.

13th Asia & Middle East Championships-2005 Venue: Sonar Gaon Pan Pacific Hotel, Dhaka, Bangladesh. Dates: 28 April 2005 – 6 May 2005.

14th Asia & Middle East Championships - 2007 Venue: Carlton Hotel, Karachi, Pakistan Dates: 12 May to 20 May 2007

15th Asia & Middle East Championships - 2009 Venue: Regency Palace Hotel, Amman, Jordan Dates: 26 June to 4 July 2009

Zone-4 & Zone-6 merger for the purpose of Olympic continental representation.

16th Asia & Middle East Championships - 2011 Venue: Chola Sheraton, Chennai, India Dates: 26 May to 1 June’11

17th Asia & Middle East Championships - 2013 Venue: Hyatt Ahmedabad, India Dates: 4 June to 11 June’13

18th Asia & Middle East Championships - 2015 Venue: Bristol Hotel, Amman, Jordan Dates: 27 May to 3 June’15

19th Asia & Middle East Championships - 2017 Venue: Holiday Inn Al Barsha Hotel, Dubai, UAE. Dates: Monday 3rd to Tuesday 11 April 2017.

20th BFAME Championships was tentatively awarded to Kuwait in 2019.

2021 TBD.

Africa
 African Bridge Championships

North America
 North American Bridge Championships

Central American & Caribbean
 Central American & Caribbean Bridge Championships

South America
 South American Bridge Championships

South Pacific
 South Pacific Bridge Championships

Other
 Buffett Cup —biennial "Europe vs North America at Bridge" modeled after the Ryder Cup of golf
 Cavendish Invitational —invitation-only money tournament operated by World Bridge Productions
 Macallan Invitational Pairs (previously known as the Sunday Times Invitational Pairs) —invitation event held in London sponsored by the manufacturers of The Macallan whisky. It was last held in 1999.

Player competitions and awards
 Triple crown of bridge

See also
 List of contract bridge books
 List of contract bridge magazines
 List of contract bridge people

References